Mojtaba Shiri (born 13 February 1990) is an Iranian footballer.

Club career
Shiri joined Rah Ahan in summer 2011 after success in technical test by the coach, Ali Daei.

Club career statistics
Last Update 14 June 2019

References

1990 births
Living people
People from Qom
Iranian footballers
Saba players
Rah Ahan players
Naft Tehran F.C. players
Paykan F.C. players
Persian Gulf Pro League players
Azadegan League players
Association football wingers